A meadow is a habitat where grasses predominate.

Meadow may also refer to:

Places

Slovenia
 Meadow 1, Meadow 2, Meadow Shaft 1, the sites of mass graves in Spodnje Gorje

United States
 Meadow, Nebraska
 Meadow, South Dakota
 Meadow, Texas
 Meadow, Utah
 Meadow Grove, Nebraska
 Peacocks Crossroads, North Carolina, formerly called "Meadow"

People
 Herb Meadow (1911–1995), American television producer and writer
 Roy Meadow (born 1933), Sir Samuel Roy Meadow, British paediatrician
 Stephanie Meadow (born 1992), golfer
 Meadow Sisto (b. 1972), American actress

Arts, entertainment, and media
The Meadow (play), a 1947 radio drama by Ray Bradbury
The Meadow, a poetry collection by James Galvin
 "Meadow" (song), a 2017 single by rock band Stone Temple Pilots
 The Meadow (film) (Il prato), a 1979 Italian film
 Meadow Soprano, a character of the HBO drama The Sopranos

Other uses
 Meadow (calf), a bovine calf fitted with double prosthetics
 Meadow (programming), an open source programming project

See also
 ST Meadow, a tugboat
 Meadows (disambiguation)
 The Meadows (disambiguation)
 Mountain Meadows (disambiguation)
 Mountain Meadow (disambiguation)